Hapalogenys, the barbeled grunters or velveltchins,  is a genus of marine ray-finned fish, it is the only genus in the monotypic family Hapalogenyidae, also spelled Hapalogeniidae.

Etymology
Hapalogenys is a compound of hapalos meaning "soft" and genys meaning "chin", Richardson stating that this referred to “velvety softness of the chin and lower lip, which is made more conspicuous by contrast with the rigidly rough scales that cover the rest of the head”.

Characteristics
Hapalogenys''' species have compressed bodies. They have 10 pores on and to the rear of the chin, these include a pair of tiny pores near the symphysis, The lower jaw and chin have dense clusters of short barbels. They have small teeth which are arranged in bands on the jaws, vomer, and palatines. They have 7 branchiostegal rays supporting the gill membranes. They have scales on the upper part and sides of the head. Their dorsal fins contain 11 spines and 13–15 soft rays while the anal fin has 3 spines and 8–9 soft rays. They have rounded caudal fins.

Species
There are currently eight recognized species in this genus:
 Hapalogenys analis J. Richardson, 1845 (Broadbanded velvetchin)
 Hapalogenys bengalensis Mohapatra, D. Ray & Kumar, 2013
 Hapalogenys dampieriensis Iwatsuki & B. C. Russell, 2006 (Australian striped velvetchin)
 Hapalogenys filamentosus Iwatsuki & B. C. Russell, 2006 (Philippine dark velvetchin)
 Hapalogenys kishinouyei  H. M. Smith & T. E. B. Pope, 1906 (Lined javelinfish)
 Hapalogenys merguiensis  Iwatsuki, Satapoomin & Amaoka, 2000 (Mergui velvetchin)
 Hapalogenys nigripinnis (Temminck & Schlegel, 1843) (Short barbeled velvetchin)
 Hapalogenys sennin  Iwatsuki & Nakabo, 2005 (Long barbeled grunter)

Systematics
The type species of the genus is Hapalogenys nitens, which was described by the Scottish naturalist and explorer Sir John Richardson in 1844, this was a synonym of Pogonias nigripinnis which had been described by Coenraad Jacob Temminck and Hermann Schlegel in the previous year. H. nitens was designated as the type species of Hapalogenys by Pieter Bleeker in 1876. The 5th edition of Fishes of the World treats the family as a separate family within the Perciformes although it is noted that they are in a clade of seven families which show that they are probably close to the Acanthuroidei, Monodactylidae, and Priacanthidae. Other authorities place the genus within the family Lobotidae, with the tigerfishes, Datnioides''.

References

External links 

 
 World Register of Marine Species: Hapalogenys

Perciformes genera
Hapalogenys
Marine fish genera
Taxa named by John Richardson (naturalist)